Karacakaya (literally "roe deer rock" in Turkish) may refer to:

People
 Batuhan Karacakaya (born 1997), Turkish actor

Places
 Karacakaya, Akyurt, a neighborhood of the district of Akyurt, Ankara Province, Turkey
 Karacakaya, Merzifon, a village in the district of Merzifon, Amasya Province, Turkey
 Karacakaya, Taşköprü, a village in Turkey